Sing! is an album by Israeli folk duo Esther & Abi Ofarim. It was released on Philips Records in 1966. The album was released as The New Esther & Abi Ofarim Album in the UK, Sing Hallelujah! in the Netherlands, and Das Neue Esther & Abi Ofarim Album in Germany.

Recording and release 
The album was produced by Abi Ofarim and musical direction by Hans Hammerschmid.

Esther & Abi Ofarim's cover of "Sing Hallelujah" by Mike Settle was released as a single in 1966, reaching No. 30 on the German singles chart. They also cover songs by Bob Dylan, Ian Tyson, and the traditional negro spiritual "Sometimes I Feel Like A Motherless Child." The single "Die Wahrheit (Die Fahrt ins Heu)" was included on the German version of the album.

Following the release of the album in October 1966, Esther & Abi Ofarim toured West Germany in November to support the album. Das Neue Esther & Abi Ofarim Album was the second of three No. 1 albums for the duo in Germany. In response to the albums Neue Songs Der Welt and Das Neue Esther & Abi Ofarim Album from the German public, the duo made a donation to the Delphin Foundation for Crippled Children in December 1966.

Das Neue Esther & Abi Ofarim Album spent a total of 56 weeks on the chart (October 15, 1966 – November 15, 1967), and topped the charts for many weeks. By early 1967, their albums collectively had sold more than a million copies in Germany alone.

Track listing 
The German version contains four additional tracks: "Ma Omrot Einayich," "Ty Posztoj," "Die Wahrheit (Die Fahrt Ins Heu)," and "Yamin Usmol."

Chart performance

References 

1966 albums
Esther & Abi Ofarim albums
Philips Records albums
Albums produced by Abi Ofarim